Zale minerea, the colorful zale, large false looper or mahogany similar-wing, is an owlet moths in the family Erebidae. The species was first described by Achille Guenée in 1852. It is found in North America.

The MONA or Hodges number for Zale minerea is 8697.

Subspecies
There are two subspecies:
 Zale minerea minerea
 Zale minerea norda Smith, 1909

References

Further reading

External links

 

Omopterini
Articles created by Qbugbot
Moths described in 1852